Ronny Jhutti (born Ajay Jhutti, 1973) is a British actor, most notable for his role as Sohail Karim in EastEnders, Danny Bartock in two episodes of Doctor Who and Naz Omar in Vexed.

Ronny was raised in London, where he was born, as Ajay Jhutti.

Career
He has appeared on television many times, including Shameless, EastEnders, Holby City, Ideal and Doctor Who (season two's The Impossible Planet/The Satan Pit). 
Ronny was in the 2008 film Cash and Curry (film). Ronny is the best friend of Ameet Chana and was cast in the part of Rohit a week before shooting commenced on the film.

Ronny was also a guest star on Totally Doctor Who in 2006 (episode #1.10).

Ronny has a part-time job as a school teacher, most notably at The Westgate School, Slough

2021–present Ronny is the voice of Adil Shah in The Archers on Radio 4.

Filmography

External links

1973 births
Living people
English male soap opera actors
Male actors from London
Date of birth missing (living people)
20th-century English male actors
21st-century English male actors
British male actors of Indian descent